Fred Basolo (11 February 1920 – 27 February 2007) was an American inorganic chemist. He received his Ph.D. at the University of Illinois at Urbana-Champaign in 1943, under Prof. John C. Bailar, Jr. Basolo spent his professional career at Northwestern University. He was a prolific contributor to the fields of coordination chemistry, organometallic, and bioinorganic chemistry, publishing over 400 papers. He supervised many Ph.D. students. With colleague Ralph Pearson, he co-authored the influential monograph "Mechanisms of Inorganic Reactions", which illuminated the importance of  mechanisms involving coordination compounds. This work, which integrated concepts from ligand field theory and physical organic chemistry, signaled a shift from a highly descriptive nature of coordination chemistry to a more quantitative science.

Biography
Giovanni Basolo and Catherina Morena Basolo immigrated from the Piedmont area of Italy to Illinois. They had three children there; the youngest was Alfredo Basolo (he began calling himself "Fred" when he entered elementary school). He was educated in the local public schools, then entered Southern Illinois Normal School (now Southern Illinois University, receiving his B.Ed. in 1940. He transferred to University of Illinois for graduate school, receiving his M.Ch in 1942 and his Ph.D. in Chemistry in 1943. He spent the remaining World War II years performing vital research at Rohm & Haas. In Fall 1946 he accepted a position as Instructor of Chemistry at Northwestern University at Evanston, Illinois. He tutored a first-year chemistry student, Mary Nutely that year. She ended up failing her chemistry class, but they were married on 14 June 1947. They eventually had four children (three daughters and a son, all of whom became educators as adults). 
The Basolo family spent 1954-55 in Europe thanks to a Guggenheim Grant. Basolo worked in the laboratory of Danish chemist Jannik Bjerrum; they were also able to tour several countries, including Italy, where they met his parents' relatives.
Basolo advanced steadily through the academic ranks at NU: Instructor (1946–50); Assistant Professor (1950–55); Associated Professor (1955–58); Professor (1958–79); Distinguished Professor (1980-1990). He chaired the Chemistry Department from 1969 to 1972.

In 1997 he and his wife were in an automobile accident. She succumbed to her injuries on 5 February 1997; he had several surgeries to repair his back, but lost the use of his legs. For the last ten years of his life he used a motorized wheelchair for mobility. He died at the Midwest Palliative and Hospice Care Center in Skokie, Illinois of congestive heart failure.

Publications
Among the many topics on which Basolo published were the indenyl effect, the reaction of coordinated ligands, and synthetic models for myoglobin.

His autobiography, From Coello to Inorganic Chemistry: A Lifetime of Reactions, was published in 2002.

Honors and awards
A member of the National Academy of Sciences, Basolo was awarded the George Pimentel Award in Chemical Education.

1983 President of the American Chemical Society. 
1983 The same year, he was elected a Fellow of the American Academy of Arts and Sciences. 
1992 Chemical Pioneer Award from the American Institute of Chemists
1993 American Institute of Chemists Gold Medal.
2001 Priestley Medal

References

External links
https://web.archive.org/web/20070221211720/http://www.cerm.unifi.it/FondSacc/basolo.html
http://pubs.acs.org/cen/news/85/i10/8510notw8.html
 
 

1920 births
2007 deaths
Fellows of the American Academy of Arts and Sciences
Inorganic chemists
Northwestern University faculty
People from Franklin County, Illinois
University of Illinois at Springfield alumni
Members of the United States National Academy of Sciences
20th-century American chemists